Craig Bernard  is a Canadian film director and executive producer. He is best known for his music videos for musical groups such as Disturbed, Stone Sour, Avicii, Bruno Mars, and Grouplove, along with his work in the VR space. In 2003, Bernard received two separate nominations for The Juno Award’s Video of The Year, for his videos for David Usher’s “Black Black Heart” and Danko Jones’ “Lovercall”.

Career 
Bernard studied English at the University of Toronto, then worked as a concert photographer in Vancouver. After becoming involved with production and writing treatments for several productions, he directed his first music video in 2001 for the Canadian band Jersey. In 2003, Bernard received two separate nominations for The Juno Award’s Video of The Year, for his videos for David Usher’s “Black Black Heart” and Danko Jones’ “Lovercall”. Most recently, Bernard directed the music video for Disturbed’s “The Light”.

Bernard later transitioned from VFX-heavy music videos to the VR space first became involved with VR content through his work as an Executive Producer on the project Dark Ride, a 360 branded content created for Lexus. He subsequently began working with the production company SAMO VR, producing the 2016 Eden VR music video “Drugs”. In 2017, Bernard became the Executive Producer at Fever Content, a Los Angeles-based Immersive Entertainment company, however, in a 2019 interview he revealed that he had stepped down from his role in the company to focus on other projects.

Filmography

Director 
  Korn  "Worst Is On Its Way" (2022)
 High Holy Days "All My Real Friends" (2004)
 Dank Jones "I Want You" (2003)
 Theory of a Deadman "Point to Prove" (2003)
 Treble Charger  (2002)
 Jersey "Saturday Night" (2001)
 David Usher "Black Black Heart" (2001)
 Dank Jones "Lovercall" (2001)

Executive Producer 

 Eden "Drugs" (2016)
 Wolf Alice "You're A Germ" (2015)
 Kaskade "Never Sleep Alone" (2015)
 Grouplove "I'm With You" (2014)
 Chromeo "Come Alive" (2014)
 Avicii "Hey Brother" (2013)
 Grouplove "Ways to Go" (2013)
 Colbie Caillat "Hold On" (2013)
 Grouplove "Shark Attack" (2013)
 Bruno Mars "Locked Out of Heaven" (2012)
 Kerli "The Lucky Ones" (2012)
 Bruno Mars "When I Was Your Man" (2012)
 Twin Atlantic "What is Light? Where is Laughter?" (2011)
 Ceelo Green "I want You" (2011)
 Inna "Club Rocker" (2011)
 Awolnation "Kill Your Heroes" (2011)

References

External links 
 
 Craig Bernard on IMVMDb
 

American film producers
Canadian film producers
American music video directors
American music video producers
Canadian music video directors
Living people
Music video producers
University of Toronto alumni
Year of birth missing (living people)